Demmin-Land is an Amt in the Mecklenburgische Seenplatte district, in Mecklenburg-Vorpommern, Germany. The seat of the Amt is in Demmin, itself not part of the Amt.

The Amt Demmin-Land consists of the following municipalities:

References

Ämter in Mecklenburg-Western Pomerania
Mecklenburgische Seenplatte (district)

pl:Urząd Demmin-Land